Woonsocket High School is a high school in Woonsocket, Rhode Island, USA (in Providence County). It is the only public high school in the city. Manufacturer and abolitionist, Edward Harris, donated the original land for the public high school.

Demographics
From grades 9–12 at the Woonsocket high school there are 1556 students, 52% of which are male, and 48% female. The teacher to student ratio is 20:1.

1% of the students are American Indian. 7% are asian, 10% are black, 0.3% are Hawaiian, 29% are hispanic, 48% are white, and 5% of the students have two or more races.

60% of students have economic disadvantages, 53% of students are currently receiving free lunch and 6% get reduced lunch.

Advanced placement testing 
14% of students participated in Advanced Placement testing and out of the 14%, 22% passed. The percentage of disadvantaged students who are proficient in testing is 10.9%. Out of the students who don't have  a disadvantage, 22.7% are proficient in testing.

Sports 
Woonsocket High School's mascot is the Villa Novans, and its colors are maroon and white. The sports available at the school are Baseball, basketball, football, Ice hockey, Soccer, Volleyball, and wrestling for boys and Basketball, field hockey, Soccer, softball, and Volleyball for girls. The high school athletes compete in the Rhode Island Interscholastic League (RIIL) in which most of Rhode Island's public and private schools compete. The city has various sporting facilities, including a football/soccer field, a baseball field, a gymnasium for basketball all on the school's grounds, and several tennis courts.

See also
List of high schools in Rhode Island

References

External links

Public high schools in Rhode Island
Schools in Providence County, Rhode Island